Septemchitonina is an extinct suborder of polyplacophoran molluscs.

References 

Chitons
Prehistoric mollusc taxonomy
Mollusc suborders